Ogotemmeli (also: Ogotemmêli or  Ogotommeli, died 1962) was the Dogon elder and hogon who narrated the cosmogony, cosmology and symbols of the Dogon people to French anthropologist Marcel Griaule during the 1930s, 1940s, and 1950s,  that went on to be documented and adapted by contemporary scholars. A lot of what is known about the Dogon religion, cosmogony and symbolism came from Griaule's work, which in turn came from Ogotemmeli—who taught it to him.

Early life and work
Ogotommeli was blind since his youth as a result of his gun accidentally exploding in his face during a hunting expedition. That incident occurred as he was about to fire at a porcupine.  Despite the painful accident and his disability, Ogotemmeli attributed it to fate. As a diviner, elder and hogon, Ogotemmeli recounted that–that fate, was previously made known to him but he chose to ignore it, and as such, had paid a costly price for ignoring the predictions.

In 1931, Marcel Griaule was on an ethnographical expedition in West Africa. He has heard of Ogotemmeli's name and reputation—as a famous diviner and "a man of outstanding wisdom" in the region. As such, Griaule tried to get an interview with him—sending messengers to search for him. When Ogotemmeli finally agreed to the interview, Griaule left for the Dogon region of Mali in 1933. For thirty–three days, Ogotemelli divulged to Griaule the Dogon's belief system.

Those conversations with Ogotemmeli resulted in Griaule's most famous work—a diary of religious instructions by the high priest titled   Dieu D'eau or Conversations With Ogotemmeli (Griaule, M., Conversations with Ogotemmêli: An Introduction to Dogon Religious Ideas (contribution: Dieterlen, Germaine, International African Institute), International African Institute (1965),  (Originally published in 1948 as Dieu d'Eau)), and a finished anthropological report on the Dogon religion titled Le Renard Pale or The Pale Fox.

Griaule's work has been criticised by scholars over the years as being "too idealistic at the expense of historical dynamism."

In anthropology, Ogotemmeli has become a well known name to the extend that, "it epitomizes "the informant", the person who describes phenomena and traits of his/her own culture, making them understandable to the researcher."

Death
Ogotemmeli died in 1962.

See also
Saltigue
Nommo
Serer creation myth
Serer religion

References

Bibliography
Asante, Molefi Kete; Mazama, Ama; Encyclopedia of African Religion, Volume 1, SAGE (2009), pp. 40–41, 213, 268,  (retrieved March 3, 2020)  
Insoll, Timothy, Archaeology, Ritual, Religion, Routledge (2004), p. 123–125,  (retrieved March 3, 2020)  
Scranton, Laird, (cont. John Anthony West), Sacred Symbols of the Dogon: The Key to Advanced Science in the Ancient Egyptian Hieroglyphs, Simon and Schuster (2007), pp. 151–2,  (retrieved March 3, 2020) 
Indian Council for Africa, Indian Centre for Africa; Africa Quarterly, Volumes 45-46,  Indian Centre for Africa (2006), p. 51
Masolo, D. A., African Philosophy in Search of Identity : African systems of thought, (ed. International African Institute), Indiana University Press (1994), pp. 68–69,  (retrieved March 3, 2020) 
Andreozzi, Matteo; Massaro, Alma; Stallwood, Kim; and Tonutti, Sabrina; Relations 1.2 - November 2013: Inside the Emotional Lives of Non-human Animals: Part II, LED Edizioni Universitarie (2013), p. 14,  (retrieved March 3, 2020)

Further reading
Griaule, M., Conversations with Ogotemmêli: An Introduction to Dogon Religious Ideas (contribution: Dieterlen, Germaine, International African Institute), International African Institute (1965),  (Originally published in 1948 as Dieu d'Eau)
Heusch, Luc de, Sacrifice in Africa: A Structuralist Approach, (trans. Linda O'Brien, Alice Morton), Manchester University Press (1985),  (retrieved March 3, 2020)  
Gravrand, Henry, La Civilisation Sereer - "Pangool", vol. 2. Les Nouvelles Editions Africaines du Senegal (1990),  pp. 194–5, 199-203 
Calame-Griaule, Geneviève,  Words and the Dogon World, Institute for the Study of Human Issues (1986),  
Curry, Patrick, Divination: Perspectives for a New Millennium, Routledge (2016),  (retrieved March 3, 2020)  
Peck, Philip M., '"Recasting Divination Research'" [in] John Pemberton III (ed.), Insight and Artistry in African Divination (Washington, DC and London: Smithsonian Institution Press (2002)
Imperato, Pascal James, Dogon Cliff Dwellers: The Art of Mali's Mountain People, L. Kahan Gallery/African Arts, (1978)
Ezra, Kate, Art of the Dogon: Selections from the Lester Wunderman Collection, Metropolitan Museum of Art (1988),  (retrieved March 3, 2020)  
Tally, Justine, Toni Morrison's 'Beloved': Origins, Routledge (2008),  (retrieved March 3, 2020)  
Petit, Véronique, Population Studies and Development from Theory to Fieldwork, Springer (2017),  (retrieved March 3, 2020)  
Bruijn, Mirjam de; & Dijk, Rijk van; The Social Life of Connectivity in Africa, Palgrave Macmillan (2012),  (retrieved March 3, 2020)  
Adjaye, Joseph K., Time in the Black Experience'' (Issue 167 of Contributions in Afro-American and African studies), Greenwood Publishing Group (1994), p. 92,  (retrieved March 3, 2020) 

Dogon people
African shamanism
1962 deaths